The Madrisa (or Madrisahorn) is a mountain in the Rätikon mountain range, overlooking Klosters in the Swiss canton of Graubünden. Its summit (2,826 metres) is located near the Austrian border.

The Madrisa is constituted by several secondary summits, notably the Gargeller Madrisa (2,770 metres), overlooking Gargellen in Austria.

Ski lifts up to 2,600 metres are located on the Klosters side.

References

External links

 Madrisahorn on Hikr.org

Mountains of the Alps
Mountains of Switzerland
Mountains of Graubünden
Two-thousanders of Switzerland
Klosters-Serneus